Joseph Anthony Zziwa (born 16 February 1956), is a Ugandan  Roman Catholic prelate who serves as the Bishop of the Diocese of Kiyinda-Mityana. He was appointed as Bishop of Kiyinda-Mityana on 23 October 2004.

Background and priesthood
Joseph Zziwa was born on 16 February 1956 at Kasambya Village, in Mubende Parish, in present-day Mubende District in the Buganda Region of Uganda. This location lies in present-day Kiyinda-Mityana Diocese. He was ordained priest on 16 November 1980 at Kiyinda-Mityana. He served as priest in the diocese until 19 November 2001.

As bishop
He was appointed bishop on 19 November 2001 and consecrated as auxiliary bishop Kiyinda-Mityana Diocese on 16 March 2002, by Bishop Joseph Mukwaya, Bishop of Kiyinda-Mityana, assisted by Cardinal Emmanuel Wamala, Archbishop of Kampala and Archbishop Christophe Louis Yves Georges Pierre, Titular Archbishop of Gunela, and Papal Nuncio to Uganda at that time. On 23 October 2004, Bishop Zziwa succeeded Bishop Emeritus Joseph Mukwaya, who resigned. Bishop Zziwa is the third Ordinary Bishop of Kiyinda-Mityana.

In July 2014, Bishop Zziwa, together with Bishop Sabino Ocan Odoki of the Roman Catholic Diocese of Arua, were elected to the Committee of Bishops of the Association of Members of Episcopal Conference of Eastern Africa (AMECEA), whose member countries are Eritrea, Ethiopia, Kenya, Malawi, Sudan, Tanzania, Uganda, Zambia Djibouti and Somalia. Bishop Zziwa also serves as the Chairman of the Uganda Episcopal Conference. He was elected to that position by his fellow bishops in Uganda, in November 2018 and reelected in November 2022 for the next four-year non-renewable term.

See also
 Cyprian Kizito Lwanga
 Uganda Martyrs
 Roman Catholicism in Uganda

References

External links
Bishops seek to change Africa’s negative brand As of 22 July 2020.

1956 births
Living people
21st-century Roman Catholic bishops in Uganda
People from Mubende District
Roman Catholic bishops of Kiyinda–Mityana